Daryevka is a rural locality (a village) in Ismagilovsky Selsoviet, Aurgazinsky District, Bashkortostan, Russia. The population was 4 as of 2010. There is 1 street.

Geography 
Daryevka is located 32 km northeast of Tolbazy (the district's administrative centre) by road. Nikolskoye is the nearest rural locality.

References 

Rural localities in Aurgazinsky District